Manton is an outer rural locality of Darwin.  The name is derived from Manton Dam on the Manton River, named by Government Resident B. T. Finniss for his second-in-command James Thomas Manton.

References

External links

Suburbs of Darwin, Northern Territory